Al-Kawm (also spelled, el-Kowm) is a village in the al-Kowm oasis in central Syria north of al-Sukhnah and south of Raqqa. The oasis also contains a series of important archaeological sites, together known as El Kowm. In 2004 the village had a population of 1,771.

During the Syrian Civil War ISIS mostly had control over this town until the SAA captured it on 14 August 2017.

Between 12-13 December 2022, ISIS militants temporarily took control of the town for day under the cover of fog following clashes near the area on 12 December, that resulted in the deaths of 6 Syrian soldiers.

References

Populated places in Tadmur District